The MAT-49 is a submachine gun which was developed by French arms factory Manufacture Nationale d'Armes de Tulle (MAT) for use by the French Army and was first produced in 1949.

Development
In 1949, after evaluating several prototypes (including a collapsible design from Hotchkiss), the French MAT factory began production of the MAT-49 9 mm submachine gun. The MAT-49 used a machine stamping process which allowed the economical production of large numbers of submachine guns, then urgently required by the French Government for use by Army, French Foreign Legion as well as airborne and colonial forces to meet the need of a compact weapon.

Production continued at Tulle until the mid-1960s, then switched to the Manufacture d'armes de Saint-Étienne plant (MAS), where the weapon was produced until 1973. In 1979, the French armed forces adopted the FAMAS 5.56 mm NATO assault rifle, and the MAT-49 was gradually phased out of service.

Usage

The MAT-49 saw widespread combat use during the First Indochina War and the Algerian War, as well as the 1956 Suez Crisis. The weapon found considerable favor with airborne and mechanized troops, who prized it for its simplicity, ruggedness, firepower and compactness.

After French forces left Indochina, the People's Army of Vietnam and Viet Minh converted many captured MAT-49s to the Soviet 7.62 mm Tokarev pistol cartridge, then available in large quantities from the Soviet Union and the People's Republic of China. These converted versions could be distinguished by a longer barrel and a higher rate of fire at 900 rpm.

North Vietnam covertly provided MAT-49s to anti-French occupation groups during the Algerian War after the French left Indochina.

Overview
As issued, the MAT-49 fires a 9×19mm Parabellum cartridge, using a single-column 20-round magazine for desert use or 32-round similar to the Sten magazine.

The MAT-49 is blowback-operated and box magazine-fed, with a rate of fire of 600 rounds per minute on full auto. The MAT 49/54, a modified MAT-49s manufactured for police forces, had two triggers, allowing use of full-auto fire or single shots, but most were manufactured as full-auto only. The weapon incorporates a grip safety which is located on the backside of the pistol grip. Production ceased before the introduction of the FAMAS assault rifle in 1979.

Variants
MAS-48 - prototype variant.
MAT-49 - main variant.
MAT-49/54 - gendarme variant with extended barrel and fixed wooden stock with a sling bar.
MAT-49 silenced - variant fitted with a suppressor.
MAT-49 M - variant modified by the Viet Minh, firing in 7.62×25mm Tokarev. It had a longer barrel, modified 35-round magazine, and a higher rate of fire (900 rpm). It was distinguished from the 9mm version by having a letter "K" stamped on the top of the receiver's endcap and the side of the compatible magazines. Spare parts were still produced in the early 1970s, the gun being used by the Viet Cong.

Users

: Adopted by the French army in 1949. Also used by the National Gendarmerie.

: Used in small numbers by the Shahrbani.
: Received from French government during First Indochina War.

 - Armed and Security Forces of Mali

: used by police and special forces
: Captured MAT-49s donated to Village guards.

: used 9mm and 7.62mm MAT-49s.

Non-state entities
  National Liberation Army (Libya)
  Zimbabwe African National Liberation Army
  Viet Minh, known as Tuyn, from the name of the manufacturer (Tulle).
  ETA: Produced unlicensed copies of existing weapons in an underground workshop at Mouguerre after it was raided by police.
  Sahrawi Arab Democratic Republic
  FRELIMO
 Séléka

See also
Gevarm D4
Hotchkiss Type Universal
Sola submachine gun
Vigneron submachine gun
MAS-38 replaced in the 1950s by the MAT-49 submachine gun.

In popular culture
In the video game Team Fortress 2, one of the playable classes, Sniper, appears to use a submachine gun, heavily inspired by the MAT-49 but with oversized sights and no stock as one of his standard weapons.

References

External links

7.62×25mm Tokarev submachine guns
9mm Parabellum submachine guns
Blowback-operated firearms
Cold War weapons of France
Infantry weapons of the Cold War
Submachine guns of France
Weapons and ammunition introduced in 1949